{{DISPLAYTITLE:C12H16O4}}
The molecular formula C12H16O4 (molar mass: 224.26 g/mol, exact mass: 224.1049 u) may refer to:

 2,4,5-Trimethoxypropiophenone
 Olivetolic acid